Aphonia is defined as the inability to produce voiced sound. Damage to the nerve may be the result of surgery (e.g., thyroidectomy) or a tumor.

Aphonia means "no sound". In other words, a person with this disorder has lost their voice.

Causes
Injuries are often the cause of aphonia. Minor injuries can affect the second and third dorsal area in such a manner that the lymph patches concerned with coordination become either atrophic or relatively nonfunctioning. Tracheotomy can also cause aphonia.

Any injury or condition that prevents the vocal cords, the paired bands of muscle tissue positioned over the trachea, from coming together and vibrating will have the potential to make a person unable to speak. When a person prepares to speak, the vocal folds come together over the trachea and vibrate due to the airflow from the lungs. This mechanism produces the sound of the voice. If the vocal folds cannot meet together to vibrate, sound will not be produced. Aphonia can also be caused by and is often accompanied by fear.

Psychogenic
Psychogenic aphonia is often seen in patients with underlying psychological problems. Laryngeal examination will usually show bowed vocal folds that fail to adduct to the midline during phonation. However, the vocal folds will adduct when the patient is asked to cough. Treatment should involve consultation and counseling with a speech pathologist and, if necessary, a psychologist.

In this case, the patient's history and the observed unilateral immobility rules out function aphonia.

See also 
 Muteness
 Lists of language disorders

References

External links 

 Muscle Tension Aphonia Video Example

Symptoms and signs: Speech and voice
Neurobiological brain disorder
Larynx disorders
Muteness